Nanguneri block is a revenue block in the Tirunelveli district of Tamil Nadu, India with a total of 27 panchayat villages. Latest development in the Nanguneri Taluk (township) is the provision of over 2500 acres of land in the region to promote a Multi Product Special Economic zone. This project is headed by TIDCO & Amrl Hitech City Ltd. Here, multi-product units are being streamlined.
All segments of manufacturing units are in the fray (pharmaceutical giants, Industrial giants, IT giants, automobile giants, chemical giants, etc). 
Within a span of ten years, Nanguneri is envisioned to be an important place that will be marked on the international industrial city map.

References 

 

Revenue blocks of Tirunelveli district